Stephen Richards (1820 – October 4, 1894) was a lawyer and political figure of Ontario, Canada. He represented Niagara in the Legislative Assembly of Ontario as a Conservative member from 1867 to 1874.

He was born in Brockville in 1820 and educated in Toronto. He was called to the bar in 1844. In 1858, he was named Queen's Counsel. He was elected to the provincial legislature in an 1867 by-election after the sitting member resigned. He served as Commissioner of Crown Lands in the Executive Council of the province from 1867 to 1871 and provincial secretary in 1871. He died in Toronto in 1894.

One of his brothers, William Buell Richards, was the first Chief Justice of Canada. Another, Albert Norton Richards, was a member of the Canadian House of Commons and Lieutenant-Governor of British Columbia.

External links 
 Member's parliamentary history for the Legislative Assembly of Ontario
 The Canadian parliamentary companion and annual register, 1874, HJ Morgan

1820 births
1894 deaths
Progressive Conservative Party of Ontario MPPs
Treasurers of the Law Society of Upper Canada
Provincial Secretaries of Ontario
People from Brockville
Canadian King's Counsel